Anzob (Tajik: Анзоб) is a village and jamoat in north-west Tajikistan. The jamoat has a total population of 8,238 (2015). It is located on the M34 highway and in the Yaghnob River valley. Anzob has a mining and beneficiation complex.

The Jamoat consists of 23 villages, including Takfon (the seat), Anzob, Bidev, Dehbaland, Dumzoy, Gharmayn, Kashi, Khishortob, Kiryonti, Marghtumayn, Nomitkon, Piskon, Qul, Tagichinor and Waghinzoy.

Anzob Pass

On October 23, 1997, an avalanche killed 46 people, burying 15 trucks and cars. The avalanche was so large that it took two weeks for the would-be rescuers to reach the victims. Due to the importance of the route connecting the north to south and its level of danger, the  Anzob Tunnel was built, completed in 2006. Construction was delayed due to electricity faults and other problems.

References

External links
Satellite map at Maplandia.com

Populated places in Sughd Region
Jamoats of Tajikistan
Mountain passes of Tajikistan